Solrun Flatås (born 28 August 1967) is a Norwegian cyclist. She was born in Tynset.

She competed at the 2000 Summer Olympics in Sydney.

References

External links 
 

1967 births
Living people
People from Tynset
Norwegian female cyclists
Olympic cyclists of Norway
Cyclists at the 2000 Summer Olympics
Sportspeople from Innlandet